General elections were held in Sweden on 17 September 1944. The Swedish Social Democratic Party remained the largest party, winning 115 of the 230 seats in the Andra kammaren of the Riksdag. Due to World War II, the four main parties continued to form a wartime coalition, only excluding the Communist Party.

Results

References

General elections in Sweden
Sweden
General
Sweden